Alvin David Luplow Jr. (pronounced "LOOP-low;" March 13, 1939 – December 28, 2017) was an American professional baseball outfielder. A native of Saginaw, Michigan, he played in Major League Baseball from 1961 through 1967 for the Cleveland Indians, New York Mets and Pittsburgh Pirates. 

Luplow attended Michigan State University, where he played varsity football, before signing his first pro contract with Cleveland.

Appearing in 481 games over all or parts of seven Major League seasons, Luplow collected 292 hits (including 33 home runs) in 1,243 at bats. In , his first full year in MLB, Luplow attained career bests in most offensive categories, including hits (88), doubles (15), homers (14), runs batted in (45), and batting (.277). Usually serving in a reserve role, Luplow was the regular right fielder for the 1964 Indians and the 1966 Mets.

He is, however, remembered for making one of the most spectacular catches in the history of Fenway Park on June 27, 1963, off the bat of Red Sox hitter Dick Williams. With the tying runs on base, in the eighth inning, Luplow raced back to the right field bullpen wall, leapt, and made a backhanded catch as he flew over the fence, and tumbled head-first into the bullpen.

He died on Thursday December 28, 2017.

His great-nephew, Jordan Luplow, is currently an outfielder for the Arizona Diamondbacks.

References

External links

Feldman, Jay, "He Leaped a Wall to Catch the Ball, But Here's the Catch: Who Saw It?", Sports Illustrated, October 14, 1985

1939 births
2017 deaths
Baseball players from Michigan
Batavia Indians players
Cleveland Indians players
Major League Baseball outfielders
Michigan State Spartans baseball players
Michigan State Spartans football players
Mobile Bears players
New York Mets players
Pittsburgh Pirates players
Players of American football from Michigan
Portland Beavers players
Reading Indians players
Salt Lake City Bees players
Sportspeople from Saginaw, Michigan